The following is the Canadian order of precedence for decorations and medals in the Canadian Honours System. Where applicable, post-nominal letters are indicated.

Awards of valour

National orders

Provincial orders

Territorial orders

National decorations

National decorations not included in order of precedence
The Royal Victorian Chain a personal award of the monarch that is of high status, but does not confer on the recipient any title or post-nominal letters, nor is it included in the order-in-council setting out the order of precedence for the wear of honours, decorations, and medals.

National medals

National medals not included in order of precedence
Certain national medals are recognized as a part of the Canadian honours system but are not included in the Order in Council that sets out the precedence of honours, decorations, and medals in Canada.

War and operational service medals

Special service medals

United Nations medals

United Nations medals not included in order of precedence
Certain United Nations medals are recognized as a part of the Canadian honours system but are not included in the Order in Council that sets out the precedence of honours, decorations, and medals in Canada.

North Atlantic Treaty Organization medals

International mission medals

Polar and Volunteer medals

Commemorative medals

Long service and good conduct medals

Exemplary service medals

Special medals

Other decorations and medals

 Commonwealth orders (approved by the King-in-Council)
 Commonwealth decorations (approved by the King-in-Council)
 Commonwealth medals (approved by the King-in-Council)
 Foreign orders (approved by the King-in-Council)
 Foreign decorations (approved by King-in-Council)
 Foreign medals (approved by the King-in-Council)

There are a number of honours and medals administered by provincial, territorial, and municipal governments, which are not on the list, such as the Order of Polaris, membership in which is awarded by the government of Yukon's Transportation Hall of Fame. This means that they are not part of the Canadian honours system and their insignia must be worn on the right side of the chest, similar to organizational medals granted by the Royal Canadian Legion or the Canadian Cadet Organizations.

British awards granted prior to 1 June 1972
Any person who, prior to June 1, 1972, was a member of a British order or the recipient of a British decoration or medal may wear the insignia of the decoration or medal together with the insignia of any Canadian order, decoration or medal that the person is entitled to wear, the proper sequence being the following:

Orders and decorations
 Victoria Cross (VC)
 George Cross (GC)
 Cross of Valour (CV)
 Order of Merit (OM) 
 Order of the Companions of Honour (CH) 
 Companion of the Order of Canada (CC)
 Officer of the Order of Canada (OC)
 Member of the Order of Canada (CM)
 Commander of the Order of Military Merit (CMM)
 Commander of the Order of Merit of the Police Forces (COM)
 Companion of the Order of the Bath (CB)
 Companion of the Order of St Michael and St George (CMG)
 Commander of the Royal Victorian Order (CVO)
 Commander of the Order of the British Empire (CBE)
 Companion of the Distinguished Service Order (DSO)
 Officer of the Order of Military Merit (OMM)
 Officer of the Order of Merit of the Police Forces (OOM)
 Lieutenant of the Royal Victorian Order (LVO)
 Officer of the Order of the British Empire (OBE)
 Companion of the Imperial Service Order (ISO)
 Member of the Order of Military Merit (MMM)
 Member of the Order of Merit of the Police Forces (MOM)
 Member of the Royal Victorian Order (MVO)
 Member of the Order of the British Empire (MBE)
 Member of the Royal Red Cross (RRC)
 Distinguished Service Cross (DSC)
 Military Cross (MC)
 Distinguished Flying Cross (DFC)
 Air Force Cross (AFC)
 Star of Military Valour (SMV)
 Star of Courage (SC)
 Meritorious Service Cross (MSC)
 Medal of Military Valour (MMV)
 Medal of Bravery (MB)
 Meritorious Service Medal (MSM)
 Associate of the Royal Red Cross (ARRC)
 The Most Venerable Order of St John of Jerusalem (all grades)
(post-nominal letters only for internal use by the Order of St John)
 Provincial Orders (order of precedence as set out in current precedence)
 Distinguished Conduct Medal (DCM)
 Conspicuous Gallantry Medal (CGM)
 George Medal (GM)
 Distinguished Service Medal (DSM)
 Military Medal (MM)
 Distinguished Flying Medal (DFM)
 Air Force Medal (A.F.M.)
 Queen's Gallantry Medal (QGM)
 Royal Victorian Medal (RVM)
 British Empire Medal (BEM)

War and operational service medals
 Queen's South Africa Medal (1900-1902) 
 King's South Africa Medal (1902)
 Africa General Service Medal (1902–56)
 India General Service Medal (1908–35)
 Naval General Service Medal (1915–62)
 India General Service Medal (1936–39)
 General Service Medal - Army and Air Force (1918–62)
 General Service Medal (1962- )
 1914 Star
 1914–15 Star
 British War Medal (1914–18)
 Mercantile Marine War Medal (1914–18)
 Victory Medal (1914–18)
 Territorial Force War Medal (1914–19)
 1939-1945 Star
 Atlantic Star
 Air Crew Europe Star
 Africa Star
 Pacific Star
 Burma Star
 Italy Star
 France and Germany Star
 Defence Medal
 Canadian Volunteer Service Medal
 Newfoundland Volunteer War Service Medal (this award has the same precedence as the Canadian Volunteer Service Medal)
 War Medal (1939–45)
 Korea Medal
 Canadian Volunteer Service Medal for Korea
 Gulf and Kuwait Medal
 Somalia Medal
 South-West Asia Service Medal
 General Campaign Star

Special service medals
Order of Precedence as set out above in current precedence

United nations medals
Order of Precedence as set out above in current precedence

International Commission and Organizational medals
Order of Precedence as set out above in current precedence

Polar medals
The order of precedence is the date on which they are awarded.

Commemorative medals
 King Edward VII Coronation Medal (1902) 
 King George V Coronation Medal (1911)
 King George V Silver Jubilee Medal (1935)
 King George VI Coronation Medal (1937)
 Queen Elizabeth II Coronation Medal (1953)
 Canadian Centennial Medal (1967)
 Queen Elizabeth II Silver Jubilee Medal (1977)
 125th Anniversary of the Confederation of Canada Medal (1992)
 Queen Elizabeth II Golden Jubilee Medal (2002)
 Queen Elizabeth II Diamond Jubilee Medal (2012)

Long service and good conduct medals
 Army Long Service and Good Conduct Medal
 Naval Long Service and Good Conduct Medal
 Air Force Long Service and Good Conduct Medal
 R.C.M.P. Long Service Medal
 Volunteer Officer's Decoration (VD)
 Volunteer Long Service Medal
 Colonial Auxiliary Forces Officer's Decoration (VD)
 Colonial Auxiliary Forces Long Service Medal
 Efficiency Decoration (ED)
 Efficiency Medal
 Naval Volunteer Reserve Decoration (VRD)
 Naval Volunteer Reserve Long Service and Good Conduct Medal
 Air Efficiency Award
 Canadian Forces' Decoration (CD)

Exemplary service medals
Order of Precedence as set out above in current precedence

Special medal
 Queen's Medal for Champion Shot

Other decorations and medals
Order of Precedence as set out above in current precedence

Note—Canadians can still be awarded British Medals as well as Medals from other countries but they must first be approved by the Government of Canada. (See Nickle Resolution) These items are worn at the end of the current order of precedence, and one receiving a British Order, Decoration or Medal after 1 June 1972 will abide by the normal order of precedence, not the one catered to pre-1972 awardings.

See also
 List of Canadian provincial and territorial orders
 List of Canadian awards
 Commonwealth realms orders and decorations
 Canadian Forces order of precedence
 1946 New Year Honours (Canada)
 2017 Canada Day Honours
 2018 New Year Honours (Canada)
 2018 Canada Day Honours
 2019 New Year Honours (Canada)
 2019 Canada Day Honours
 2020 New Year Honours (Canada)

Notes

Citations

References
 
 
 
  P.C. 2002-1192 dates 3 Nov 2022

External links
 Order of Precedence – Governor General of Canada
 Canadian Medals Chart – Department of National Defence (archived version)
 Canadian Forces Administrative Order 18-4 Recommendations for Canadian Orders, Decorations and Military Honours

Orders, decorations, and medals of Canada
Orders of precedence in Canada